The Chicamba Hydroelectric Power Station is an operational  hydroelectric power project in Mozambique. The power plant, first established in 1968, underwent rehabilitation and upgrades in 2017, raising its generating capacity, from 38.4 megawatts to 44 megawatts, with prolongation of its lifespan by another thirty years.

Location
The power station is located at Chicamba, across the Ruvue River, in Manica Province, near the international border between Mozambique and Zimbabwe.
The geographical coordinates of Chicamba HPP are: 19°09'21.0"S, 33°08'42.0"E (Latitude:-19.155833; Longitude:33.145000).

Overview
Chicamba Power Station (44 megawatts) and the nearby Mavuzi Hydroelectric Power Station (41 megawatts), both located in Manica Province were intended to supply electricity to the provinces of Manica and neighboring Sofala, supplemented with power obtained from the Cahora Bassa Dam.

Due to their age; Chicamba HPP was commissioned in 1968 and Mavuzi HPP was established in 1957, much of the original hardware is not available on the market and maintenance was a challenge in the 21st century. For a period of 3.5 years, beginning in 2013 until February 2017, both stations underwent refurbishment and upgrades, with the contractor manufacturing new hardware to replace what could not be purchased on the open market.

Refurbishment and improvements
The refurbishment contract was awarded to a consortium comprising
Rainpower, a Norwegian supplier of hydroelectricity generating hardware and Cegelec, a French engineering company. Other entities included Hydrokarst, a French company that socializes in underwater inspection and installations.

Construction costs
The rehabilitation bill in 2017 for both Chicamba HPP and Mavuzi HPP is quoted as US$120 million (€90 million at that time). The sources of funding are illustrated in the table below:

See also

List of power stations in Mozambique

References

External links
Mozambique Sets Its Sights On Hydroelectric Development As of 24 April 2017.

Renewable energy power stations in Mozambique
Hydroelectric power stations in Mozambique
Manica Province
Energy infrastructure completed in 1968
Dams completed in 1968
1968 establishments in Mozambique